Anton Anatolyevich Zaitcev (born 22 July 1987) is a Russian tennis player.

Tennis career 
Zaitcev has a career high ATP singles ranking of 296 achieved on 24 November 2014. This ranking came shortly after his sole appearance at an ATP Challenger Tour Quarter-Final in Tashkent, Uzbekistan, where he was narrowly defeated by then world number 72 Sergiy Stakhovsky 6-4 5-7 4-6. He also has a career high ATP doubles ranking of 232 achieved on 20 July 2015. He has won five ITF singles titles and seven ITF doubles titles.

Zaitcev made his ATP main draw debut at the 2015 Kremlin Cup where he received entry to the doubles main draw as a wildcard entrant, partnering Richard Muzaev.

External links 
 
 

1987 births
Living people
Russian male tennis players
Tennis players from Moscow
People from Izmail